Patissa atricostalis is a moth in the family Crambidae. It was described by George Hampson in 1919. It is found in Australia, where it has been recorded from Western Australia and Queensland.

The wingspan is 18–22 mm. Adults are pure whitish, with a blackish costa of the forewings.

References

Moths described in 1919
Schoenobiinae